The 2001 Cerveza Club Colombia Open was a men's tennis tournament played on outdoor clay courts at the Club Campestre El Rancho in Bogotá in Colombia and was part of the International Series of the 2001 ATP Tour. It was the seventh edition of the tournament and ran from January 28 through February 3, 2001. Fernando Vicente won the singles title.

Finals

Singles

 Fernando Vicente defeated  Juan Ignacio Chela 6–4, 7–6(8–6)
 It was Vicente's only title of the year and the 3rd of his career.

Doubles

 Mariano Hood /  Sebastián Prieto defeated  Martín Rodríguez /  André Sá 6–2, 6–4
 It was Hood's only title of the year and the 4th of his career. It was Prieto's only title of the year and the 3rd of his career.

External links
 Official website 

Cerveza Club Colombia Open
Bancolombia Open
2001 in Colombian tennis